The first depictions of four-wheeled wagons pulled by semi-domesticated onagers and other available animals come from the Sumerians. 

The next step was towards faster chariots with spoke-wheels. Lighter wheels made lighter constructions possible. This made it feasible to outrun light infantry and other chariots. Additionally, the development of short composite bows made it a devastating weapon.

Slingers and javeliners, who could counterattack and protect the other troops, had no armor protection or shield discipline. They were skirmishers, keeping out of enemy range. But the moving chariots showering them with arrows were difficult to hit so they were rendered helpless against these. The role and tactics of war chariots are often compared to tanks in modern warfare but this is disputed with scholars pointing out that chariots were vulnerable and fragile, required a level terrain while tanks are all-terrain vehicles, and thus not suitable for use in the way modern tanks have been used as a physical shock force.

Chariots, carts and wagons still had the disadvantage of using more than one horse per transported soldier. Riders achieved supremacy through greater manoeuverability than chariots in the 1st millennium BCE, as soon as the domesticated horse had been bred large enough to carry an armed man.

Chariot and elephant warfare

The chariot was restricted to terrains with level ground and plenty of space. It was the core of most cavalries, and diversified into shock-troops and commanding centers. 

Agile infantry and early troops on horseback provided them protection and additional fighting power.

Light and medium chariots
There were two different ways for light chariots to operate on the battlefield.

One was to have on each chariot one warrior/archer and one driver/shieldbearer. Apart from the shield, both crewmen were fully armored and their horses were barded. The archer used a composite bow, of superior power and range, shooting heavy bronze-pointed arrows which were capable of piercing armor and transfixing a man. Disciplined companies of chariots used hit-and-run tactics to wear down enemy forces, pulling into range, stopping to shoot a volley or three, then wheeling away before the enemy could retaliate.

Another method was using melee weapons. Chariots could terrorize and scatter an enemy force by charging, threatening to run over enemy foot soldiers and attacking them with a variety of short range weapons, such as javelin, spear and axe. However, this did leave them much more vulnerable, as a single injured horse could stop and leave the chariot in the midst of the enemy.

Light chariots could be dismantled and carried across unfavorable terrain which heavier types could not, which enhanced their efficiency for warfare.

The Celtic chariot (essedum) was the longest lasting to be used in battles. It had a light and agile structure. A heavily armoured warrior stood on a small platform with two independent-running spoked wheels. His charioteer sat on a thick rope net connecting the platform to the horses. It could quickly carry the nobleman into battle and evacuate him in case of trouble, basically acting like mounted infantry. It was used on the Continent from the 700 BCE to 100 BCE  and in Britain and Ireland until the year 200 CE.  This tactic is similar to the dismounted men-at-arms or modern mechanized infantry today.

Heavy chariots as shock-troops

These were, until the advent of the war elephant in South Asia, the only cavalry shock-troops available. Usually they were employed beside troops on horseback. Up to four men stood on a chariot, wielding polearms and close combat weapons. Javelins and bows were employed for range fighting. This chariot was a heavy construction and moved relatively slowly. Light infantry could keep up with them. The momentum of this heavy chariot was sufficient to break through enemy formations, causing an effect similar to heavy cavalry with lances. Some generals, such as Cyrus II and Darius III of Persia and Mithridates of Pontus attached scythes to their chariot forces' wheels, in the further hope of breaking up enemy formations.  Historically, however, this tactic had at best mixed success, either because the horses would not charge directly into closely packed formations or because the opposing force would simply stand far enough apart from each other to avoid the scythes and then pull out the drivers as they rode through the gaps created.

Indian chariots and war elephants
Indian chariots combined the security of a chariot. By this time, infantry had learned to avoid chariots by forming passages and then attacking them in the back. The elephant introduced a new danger to an enemy formation, being equally dangerous for the infantry from the front or behind. The chariots could relatively securely follow the elephants and assist with arrowfire into the gaps. After the Greeks had their first contact in the battle of Gaugamela, this new tactic soon totally substituted chariots among shock-troops around the Mediterranean. Polybius tells that the Asian elephant "Suru" was the last one surviving after Hannibal`s passage over the Alps.

The Indian chariots were supplanted by skirmishers with range weapons. The higher density of shots and better aiming of infantry upgraded this weapon system. Elephants were used for frontal assaults against heavy infantry and for massive flanking maneuvers. They could reach a top speed of 30 km/h. Depending on the grade of their equipment it was now possible for cheaper light infantry to stand their ground against their heavy counterpart. The moving of an elephant through most battle formations seemed at first unstoppable.

Sources

Polybius on the Celtic Chariot and warfare

Bronze Age War Chariots (New Vanguard) by Nic Fields (Author), Brian Delf (Illustrator)

References

Chariots